Carmarthen Town West is an electoral ward, representing part of the community of Carmarthen, Carmarthenshire, Wales.

Profile
In 2014, the Carmarthen Town West electoral ward had an electorate of 4,124. The total population was 5,335, of whom 75.8% were born in Wales. The 2011 census indicated that 37.2% of the population were able to speak Welsh.

History
Carmarthen Town West has been an electoral ward since the 1940s. It was previously known as Carmarthen Town No.3 Ward. It is currently a two-member electoral ward for the purposes of elections to Carmarthenshire County Council and a six-member electoral ward for elections to Carmarthen Town Council.

From 1973 until 1996 it was a single-member ward for the purposes of elections to Dyfed County Council and a three-member ward for elections to Carmarthen District Council

County Council elections
In 2017 the ward seats were won by Plaid Cymru councillors Emlyn Schiavone and Alan Speake.

References

Carmarthen
Carmarthenshire electoral wards